Sverre Haugli (born 2 October 1982) is a Norwegian long track speed skater who participates in international competitions.

He represents the sports club Jevnaker IF and is the grandson of speed skater Sverre Ingolf Haugli and brother of Maren Haugli.

Personal records

Career highlights

World Allround Championships
2009 - Hamar,  9th
2010 - Heerenveen,  8th
European Allround Championships
2007 - Collalbo, 11th
2008 - Kolomna,  10th
2009 - Heerenveen,  7th
2010 - Hamar,    10th
National Championships
2007 - Geithus,  3rd at allround
2008 - Bjugn,  2nd at allround
2009 - Hamar,  3rd at 5000 m
2009 - Gol,  2nd at allround
European Youth-23 Games
2005 - Helsinki,  3rd at 10000 m

External links
Sverre Haugli at speedskatingphotos-by-biseth
Haugli at Jakub Majerski's Speedskating Database
Haugli at SkateResults.com
Pictures of Sverre Haugli
Haugli at SSN.info

1982 births
Living people
Norwegian male speed skaters
People from Oppland
Speed skaters at the 2010 Winter Olympics
Olympic speed skaters of Norway
Sportspeople from Innlandet
21st-century Norwegian people